Ratu Kalinyamat or Ratna Kencana (died after 1579) was the queen regnant of Kalinyamat and Jepara, a Javanese Islamic polity on northern coast of Central Java in ca. 1549–1579.  She is mainly known for her attack and naval
expeditions on Portuguese Malacca.

She was the daughter of Sultan Trenggana of Demak and the spouse of Sultan Hadlirin. Ratna Kencana ascended the throne after the assassination of her brother, Sunan Prawoto, and her husband by Arya Penangsang.

Reign 
Queen Kalinyamat ascended the throne after the death of her husband, the Duke of Jepara. The couple was childless, so there was no one else to become the successor. After the completion of the hermitage, she became Kanjeng Ratu Kalinyamat the queen of Kalinyamat that reign in Jepara. The coronation is marked by Surya Sengkala (chronogram): "Terus Karya Tataning Bumi" or approximately 1549 AD to the alleged date of 12 Rabi'ulAwal.

Queen Kalinyamat was described as an able and brave leader. Portuguese historical record "Da Asia" written by De Couto praised Queen Kalinyamat as "Senhora Rainha de Jepara ponderosa e rica"; which means 'the Queen of Jepara', a rich woman and has great power. Her reign marked by her overseas campaigns in the year 1550 and 1574, against Portuguese in Malacca.

References 

History of Central Java
Indonesian monarchs
16th-century women rulers
Women rulers in Indonesia
People from Demak Regency
16th-century Indonesian women